Cape Fear High School is a public secondary school in the eastern region of Cumberland County in the unincorporated community of Vander, North Carolina, and to the east of Fayetteville, North Carolina. The Cape Fear school attendance area is the largest in the county by area size.

Athletics 
Cape Fear has varsity teams in 17 sports (13 boys teams, 14 girls teams) and junior varsity teams in 8 sports (6 boys teams, 4 girls teams):
 Baseball (boys)
 Basketball
 Bowling (no JV)
 Cheerleading (only girls Varsity)
 Cross country (no JV)
 Football (boys)
 Golf (no JV)
 Indoor track and field (no JV)
 Lacrosse (no JV)
 Soccer
 Softball (girls)
 Swimming (no JV)
 Tennis (no girls JV)
 Track and field (no JV)
 Wrestling (boys)
 Volleyball (girls)

Achievements
Football – State runner-up 2016 (4A)

Softball – State runner-up 2014, 2016, 2017 (4A)

Girls' tennis – Dual Team State Champions 2021 (3A), 2022 (3A), Individual Doubles State Champions 2021 (3A), Individual Doubles State Runner-up 2022 (3A)

Academy of Natural Sciences
The Natural Science Academy is a program located at Cape Fear that acknowledges students for completing 7 or more sciences throughout their high school career while maintaining a 3.0 unweighted GPA average in these courses.

Extracurricular organizations

Marching band 
In 2014, the Cape Fear marching band placed 3rd (regardless of class) in the Bands of America Winston-Salem Regional Championship.

Winter guard 
The Cape Fear winter guard placed 18th in the Scholastic World division of the WGI Color Guard World Championship Semi-finals in 2017 and 20th in 2018.

NJROTC 
In 2016, the Cape Fear NJROTC placed 15th in the NJROTC Nationals Drill Championship.

Demographics 
The demographic breakdown of the 1,422 students enrolled in 2020–2021 was as follows:
Male – 51.2%
Female – 48.8%
Native American/Alaskan – 3.4%
Asian – 0.8%
Black – 26.8%
Hispanic – 10.2%
Hawaiian/Pacific Islander – 0.4%
White – 51.5%
Multiracial – 6.9%
51.2% of the students were male, and 48.8% were female. 49.3% of the students were eligible for free or reduced lunch.

Administration 
Jason Jordan, the current principal of Cape Fear High School, has also served as the principal of Massey Hill Classical High School. He is the sixth principal of Cape Fear.

Notable alumni 
 David R. Lewis  member of the North Carolina General Assembly
 Seth Williams  American football defensive back
 Gavin Williams  professional baseball pitcher in the Cleveland Guardians organization

See also
 Cumberland County Schools
 List of high schools in North Carolina

References

External links 
 

Public high schools in North Carolina
1969 establishments in North Carolina
Buildings and structures in Fayetteville, North Carolina
Education in Fayetteville, North Carolina
Educational institutions established in 1969
Schools in Cumberland County, North Carolina